Chester Gorham Osborne  (1915-1987) was an American composer, conductor, music instructor, trumpeter, and author.  His compositions ranged from marches to opera. His writings included historical essays and children's novels.

Life and work
Osborn was born on September 18, 1915, at Portsmouth, New Hampshire.

Osborne studied at the New England Conservatory in Boston, Massachusetts and majored in trumpet and composition. He completed further study at Northwestern University in Evanston, Illinois.

As an author Osborne primarily composed children's books, but also published in journals and worked on musical compositions while he also worked as a professional trumpet player and music educator.

As a music teacher, he taught in public schools in the states of Massachusetts following that he taught for many years in Center Moriches (New York). As a composer, he wrote mostly works for band and choirs, as well as chamber and ensemble music. In Center Moriches he served as director of music education for the Center Moriches school system and organized and led an outdoor summer music concert series.

He has done field work with New York archaeology teams, served as curator at the Museum Manor of St. George.

During World War II he was a trumpet player in the United States Army Band. Later he was a trumpet player in the Boston Symphony Orchestra when Arthur Fiedler conducted the orchestra. Osborne was an honorary member of the MENC (National Association for Music Education).

 1942 "The British Eighth" March
 1945 "Christmas Cards for Brass Sextet"
 1946 The Silver Anchor, overture
 1975 Connemara Sketches – A Folk Song Suite, Three Anthems 
 The Miller's dram
 Along the Ocean shore
 The Blacksmith and his Son
 1981 The Piper and the Captain, suite
 1983 The Heathery Mountain
 Island Overture
 Treasure Island, for piano and orchestra

He died on December 26, 1987, at Center Moriches, New York.

Books 
 The First Bow And Arrow, illustrations by Richard N. Osborne, Chicago, New York, Toronto. Wilcox & Follett Co. 1951. 88 p., (2nd, 1952; 3rd printing, 1957)
 The First Puppy, foreword by Melville J Herskovits, Dept. of Anth., NorthWestern University. illustrated by Richard N. Osborne, New York. Wilcox & Follet. 1953. 128 p., (2nd, 3rd printings)
 The First Lake Dwellers, foreword by Melville J Herskovits, Dept. of Anth., NorthWestern University. illustrated by Richard N. Osborne, New York. Follett Publishing Company, 1956. 126 p.,
 The First Wheel, illustrated by Richard N. Osborne, Chicago. Follett Publishing Co., 1959. 128 p
 The Wind and the Fire, illustrated by Rafaello Busoni. Englewood Cliffs, New Jersey, Prentice Hall Press. 1959.
 The Silver Anchor : Route of Wanderer, illustrated by Brendan Lynch, Chicago. Follett Publishing Company; 1st edition 1967. 160 p.
 The Memory String, New York. Atheneum. 1984. 154 p.,

Articles 
 Long Wood, 1968.
 The Rev. Phinehas Robinson, 1969.
 Dr. Daniel Robert, 1746–1804, 1957.
 Respose to Mrs Bigelows article – "The Tangier Smiths" – A few corrections and suggestions by Chester G. Osborne, 1973.

References

Bibliography 
 Paul E. Bierley, William H. Rehrig: The heritage encyclopedia of band music : composers and their music, Westerville, Ohio: Integrity Press, 1991, 
 Jaques Cattell Press: ASCAP biographical dictionary of composers, authors and publishers, Fourth edition, New York: R. R. Bowker, 1980, 589 p., 

American male composers
American music educators
American trumpeters
American male trumpeters
1915 births
1987 deaths
Writers from Portsmouth, New Hampshire
People from Center Moriches, New York
20th-century American composers
20th-century American writers
20th-century trumpeters
20th-century American male writers
Educators from New York (state)
20th-century American male musicians